The 1990 Czechoslovak Motorcycle Grand Prix was the thirteenth round of the 1990 Grand Prix motorcycle racing season. It took place on the weekend of 24–26 August 1990 at the Masaryk Circuit located in Brno, Czechoslovakia.

500 cc race
Wayne Gardner crashes twice in the same qualifying session, without serious injury, and Eddie Lawson highsides.

Wayne Rainey gets the start, followed closely by Gardner, then Lawson, Mick Doohan and Kevin Schwantz. Gardner through into first, Schwantz into third.

As he closes the gap to the pair in front, Schwantz's front-end tucks in and he crashes out of third place. He runs to the bike to pick it up, but it is starting to burn.

Rainey is only just managing to stay on Gardner's wheel, and eventually passes. By the last lap, Rainey is well ahead of Gardner, and he wins the race and the championship. Lawson takes third, but is absent from the podium celebrations. While it may have been a coincidence that Lawson disappeared on the day he lost his title to Rainey, Lawson had a big fight with crew chief Warren Willing about the bike and left the facilities before the podium ceremonies.

Rainey: "Then, when I crossed the finish line, and I was World Champion, I had a burst of emotion. I felt really great, for about two tenths of a second. Then it was gone, and it was like – wow, what happened to everything? Here I am, with the thing I've devoted everything to win, and there wasn’t anything there. It left me feeling really disappointed. It meant so much more to me emotionally losing the title in Sweden when I crashed out than it did winning it. It felt strange."

500 cc classification

References

Czech Republic motorcycle Grand Prix
Czechoslovak
Motorcycle Grand Prix